The Meenambakkam bomb blast was the bomb blast that occurred on August 2, 1984 at Meenambakkam International Airport at Chennai in Tamil Nadu. A total of 33 people were killed and 27 others were injured. Tamil Eelam Army (TEA) was suspected in the bombing and later a few of its members were convicted for it.

TEA was formed in 1983 with the intention of securing a Tamil Eelam and had about 1,300 volunteers. After a brief period of intense struggle, Kathiresan and about 130 others had escaped to Tamil Nadu vowing to continue their struggle. The Meenambakkam blast, their first case of subversion, however had occurred by accident.

The bombs were placed in a plane bound for Sri Lanka aiming a blast at the airport in Sri Lanka by Kathiresan. The timer was set at around 11 PM when the Air Lanka flight UL-122 was scheduled to reach Colombo International Airport. The aircraft was to leave Chennai airport at 8:10 PM on that day.

Again, their intention was to explode the bomb after the luggage were removed from the plane and dispatched to the cargo complex. The intensity of the blast would have destroyed at least six planes in the airport, police said.

The main accused, Kathiresan purchased the ticket for the Air Lanka flight but did not travel in the flight. He had, with the assistance of a Sri Lankan, Thambiraja, Saravana Bhavan (a film actor and flying club member), Chandra Kumar (a constable at the Airport Security), Loganathan (an unauthorised porter at Meenambakkam airport) and Vijayakumar (Air Lanka office peon at Meenambakkam) tried to transmit the luggage through the conveyor for clearance by the Customs. The luggage instead of getting into the cargo for Air Lanka flight, had by mistake reached the luggage for a flight to London.

But the Customs authorities detained the luggage as the passenger did not turn up for identification.

The Air Lanka flight took off from the Meenambakkam airport around 8.15 PM As the plan did not succeed, the accused who were watching the whole incident from within the airport, went to Guindy and made repeated calls warning the airport authorities about the bombs in the luggage.

Though the police tried to retrieve the luggage, a customs inspector had objected to handing over the baggage as he mistook it to be containing gold biscuits. Two calls were made by the TEA volunteers that the luggage contained explosives which would explode around 11 PM.

It was only when the third call was made, did the customs inspector concede to hand over the suitcase. But by then it was too late. The blast occurred around 10.50 PM killing over 27 transit passengers bound for Sri Lanka and six airport security officials.

Crime Branch CID police arrested 10 persons in the case while a Sri Lanka national Sree was absconding. But three accused- Kathiresan, Vigneswara Raja and Thambiraja jumped bail. The District Sessions Judge, Chengalpattu, convicted five accused - Saravana Bhavan, Loganathan, Vijay Kumar, Balasubramaniam and Chandra Kumar - were convicted and sentenced for life.

References

Mass murder in 1984
1984 in India
1980s in Madras (city)
Violence in India
Crime in Tamil Nadu
August 1984 events in Asia
1984 murders in India
Terrorist incidents in India in 1984
Terrorist attacks on airports
Terrorist attacks on airports in Asia
February 1984 events
Improvised explosive device bombings in India
Building bombings in India
Factions in the Sri Lankan Civil War
Tamil Eelam